GPT may refer to:

Computing
 Generative pre-trained transformer, a family of artificial intelligence language models
 ChatGPT, a chatbot/Generative Pre-trained Transformer model developed by OpenAI
 GUID Partition Table, a disk partitioning standard
 Get paid to surf, an on line business model
 Google Publisher Tag, a JavaScript tag embedded in HTML pages to display ads served with DoubleClick for Publishers

Biology
 Alanine transaminase or glutamate pyruvate transaminase
 Goniopora toxin
 UDP-N-acetylglucosamine—undecaprenyl-phosphate N-acetylglucosaminephosphotransferase

Companies
 GEC Plessey Telecommunications, a defunct British telecommunications manufacturer
 GPT Group, an Australian property investment company

Other uses
 Gulfport–Biloxi International Airport, in Mississippi
 General purpose technology, in economics
 Generalized probabilistic theory, a general framework to describe the operational features of physical theories.
 Grounded practical theory, a social science theory